Classical Christian education is an approach to learning rooted in the long story of Christian engagement with the classical tradition as exemplified first by figures such as the Cappadocian Fathers, Augustine and Jerome as well as the fullness of Christian monastic traditions. Its current revival in American K-12 schools started with three schools founded in 1980 to 1981: Cair Paravel-Latin School (Topeka, Kansas), Trinity School at Greenlawn (South Bend, Indiana), and Logos School (Moscow, Idaho). Various classical Christian schools emphasize and articulate different things in their approaches, but most include biblical teachings and incorporate a teaching model from the classical education movement known as the Trivium, consisting of three parts: grammar, logic, and rhetoric.

According to Douglas Wilson, this method of instruction was developed by early Christians as part of the Seven Liberal Arts. Wilson's writings and the Logos School he founded have been cited as being influential in reviving the Trivium and fueling a modern educational movement, primarily among American Protestants.

Classical Christian education is characterized by a reliance on classical works by authors such as Homer, Democritus, Sophocles, Plato, Plotinus, Josephus, Dante, Pythagoras and Shakespeare, and an integration of a Christian worldview into all subjects.  In addition, classical Christian education exposes students to Western Civilization's history, art and culture, teaching Latin as early as the second grade and often offering several years of Greek.

Philosophy

The modern Classical-Christian educational movement has its roots in the mid to late twentieth century. Its popularity grew considerably when Douglas Wilson published "The Lost Tools of Learning".  In it he expanded on a paper written by Dorothy Sayers by the same title.  She lamented that the “great defect of our education" was that schools taught information, but did not teach students how to think.   Wilson described an educational model based on the child's developmental capabilities and natural inclinations.  
From birth, the child learns language and about itself. 
From about age 2 to age 4, the child develops social skills and gains mobility and dexterity
The Grammar stage begins around age 5. In this stage, the child is in a "parrot" stage of repeating what they are told.  This phase sees them enjoying simple songs over and over, so songs, rhymes and memory aid teach the basics of reading, writing, numbers and math, and observational science. Many schools begin Latin language training in 3rd grade.  Some schools will also teach a Christian Catechism while students are in this phase, as foundation for intensive study of the texts and structures of the Bible. 
The Logic stage begins in 6th grade. At this age, students naturally develop an argumentative behavior, and are equipped with tools of logic and how to formulate a defense for an idea.  This provides the foundation for Sayers' 'teaching them to think' model. 
The Rhetoric phase happens during high school, blending the prior learning with specialized knowledge, generally in a college preparatory curriculum.

The Association of Classical and Christian Schools 
Since the 1980s, according to Andrew Kern, the classical education movement has "swept" America. The Association of Classical and Christian Schools consists of hundreds of member schools and approximately 40,000 students in the United States alone.

See also
 Christian views on the classics

Bibliography
 Norms and Nobility: A Treatise on Education (1981), by David V. Hicks
 Recovering the Lost Tools of Learning (1991), by Douglas Wilson
 The Case for Classical Christian Education (2003), by Douglas Wilson
 Classical Education: The Movement Sweeping America by Gene Edward Veith Jr. and Andrew Kern
 An Introduction to Classical Education: A Guide for Parents (2005), by Christopher Perrin
 Wisdom and Eloquence (2006), by Charles Evans and Robert Littlejohn
 The Well-Trained Mind: A Guide to Classical Education at Home (2009), by Susan Wise Bauer and Jessie Wise
 The Core: Teaching Your Child the Foundations of Classical Education (2011), by Leigh Bortins
 The Liberal Arts Tradition (Classical Academic Press, 2013), by Kevin Clark and Ravi Scott Jain
 The Question: Teaching Your Child the Essentials of Classical Education (2013), by Leigh Bortins
 The Conversation: Challenging Your Student with a Classical Education (2015), by Leigh Bortins

References

External links
 Classical Christian Education: A Look at Some History by Ben House

Christian education
 
Classical educational institutes